Seabrook is a locational surname from Seabrook, Buckinghamshire.

Notable people with this surname
 Arthur Seabrook (1895–1981), English footballer
 Brent Seabrook, a Canadian born ice hockey defenceman for the Chicago Blackhawks
 David Seabrook, a British writer and journalist
 Ian Seabrook, a Canadian-British underwater cinematographer
 John Jarvis Seabrook, an American pastor and educator
 Keith Seabrook, a Canadian born ice hockey defenceman for the Abbotsford Heat and younger brother of Brent Seabrook
 Larry Seabrook, an American politician, member of New York City Council
 Peter Seabrook (1935–2022), British gardening writer
 Whitemarsh Benjamin Seabrook, an antebellum Democratic Governor of South Carolina
 William Buehler Seabrook, an American explorer, traveller, and journalist
 Wil Seabrook, an American indie rock artist

References